Harry Kemp Morton (October 14, 1905 – June 9, 1994) was an American lawyer and politician from New York.

Life
He was born on October 14, 1905, in Hornell, Steuben County, New York, the son of Harry Laverne Morton and May (Kemp) Morton. He attended the public schools, and graduated from the University of Buffalo Law School in 1926. He was admitted to the bar in 1927, and practiced law in Hornell. He was District Attorney of Steuben County from 1945 to 1952.

Morton was a member of the New York State Senate from 1953 to 1958, sitting in the 169th, 170th and 171st New York State Legislatures. In 1958, Morton was challenged by Harold A. Jerry, Jr. in the Republican primary for re-nomination, but the result was disputed. Morton's claim to the nomination was upheld by the Appellate Division, but overturned by the New York Court of Appeals.

He died on June 9, 1994; and was buried at the Townline Cemetery in Rathbone.

Sources

External links
 

1905 births
1994 deaths
People from Hornell, New York
Republican Party New York (state) state senators
Steuben County district attorneys
University at Buffalo Law School alumni
20th-century American lawyers
20th-century American politicians